Brachoria is a genus of polydesmidan millipedes in the family Xystodesmidae inhabiting the Eastern United States. Also known as the Appalachian mimic millipedes, at least 30 species are known, with highest diversity in the Appalachian Mountains, especially the Cumberland Plateau and Ridge and Valley Province.

Species of Brachoria are boldly patterned with yellow, orange, red, violet that contrasts with a black background, and in the Appalachians some species mimic species of Apheloria where they co-occur, a phenomenon known as Müllerian mimicry

Species
There are over 30 species of Brachoria which differ mainly in characteristics of the male gonopods (reproductive appendages), but since many species have very small known ranges, geographic location can aid in identification as well.

 Brachoria badbranchensis
 Brachoria blackmountainensis
 Brachoria calceata
 Brachoria campcreekensis
 Brachoria cedra
 Brachoria conta
 Brachoria cumberlandmountainensis
 Brachoria dentata
 Brachoria divicuma
 Brachoria electa
 Brachoria enodicuma
 Brachoria evides
 Brachoria flammipes
 Brachoria glendalea
 Brachoria gracilipes
 Brachoria grapevinensis
 Brachoria guntermountainensis
 Brachoria hansonia
 Brachoria hendrixsoni
 Brachoria hoffmani
 Brachoria hubrichti
 Brachoria indianae
 Brachoria initialis
 Brachoria insolita
 Brachoria kentuckiana
 Brachoria laminata
 Brachoria ligula
 Brachoria mendota
 Brachoria ochra
 Brachoria plecta
 Brachoria sheari
 Brachoria splendida
 Brachoria virginia
 Brachoria viridicolens

References

External links
The Appalachian Mimic Millipedes: Tree of Life

Polydesmida
Millipedes of North America
Mimicry